Arcade of Frohse, sometimes called the supinator arch, is the most superior part of the superficial layer of the supinator muscle, and is a fibrous arch over the posterior interosseous nerve. 

The arcade of Frohse is a site of interosseous posterior nerve entrapment, and is believed to play a role in causing progressive paralysis of the posterior interosseous nerve, both with and without injury.

The arcade of Frohse was named after German anatomist, Fritz Frohse (1871-1916).

References

External links
 Clinical anatomy of the radial nerve
 MRI Web Clinic (MRIs of Posterior interosseous nerve entrapment)

Archade of Frohse